Hillsville is an unincorporated community in Lawrence County, Pennsylvania, United States. It is on the south side of the Mahoning River at the top of an approximately  very steep road grade up  Churchill Road from river level that passes over U.S. Route 224 by a bridge along the way. US 224 is the primary highway for travel to larger towns, and it passes just to the north of and somewhat lower than the community. There is a substandard interchange with Churchill Road within the steep portion of the grade. Hillsville has a post office with ZIP code 16132.

References

Unincorporated communities in Lawrence County, Pennsylvania
Unincorporated communities in Pennsylvania